George DelHoyo (born November 23, 1953), also known as George Deloy, is a Uruguayan-born American actor.

Theatre
DelHoyo, who was also raised in Salt Lake City, Utah, began performing in the theatre in New York City during the 1970s. Working under the name George Deloy, he performed in plays and musicals at many of the major American regional theaters such as Seattle Repertory, American Conservatory Theater in San Francisco, Old Globe Theatre in San Diego, Cincinnati Playhouse, Mark Taper Forum in Los Angeles and Huntington Theatre in Boston. His first big break came in 1976, playing Kyle Nunnery in the Broadway musical, The Robber Bridegroom.

Television
In 1978, George moved to Los Angeles and became a contract player for Universal Studios, under the screen name George Deloy. Much of his work was in television – one of his first characters was Bert in the episode "Breakout to Murder" of the NBC crime drama series The Eddie Capra Mysteries in 1978, followed in 1979 by the role of Dr. Gilbert Kent on the TV miniseries The Seekers. He starred alongside Brian Dennehy and Katherine Saltzberg in the 1982 sitcom Star of the Family playing sex-crazed Frank Rosetti. In 1986, DelHoyo landed a major role on the hit soap opera Days of Our Lives, playing the villain Orpheus. During the years of 1989-1991 George landed the role of Rob Donnelly on the soap opera Generations. During the 1980s and 1990s he was known primarily as a guest or recurring character on hit shows such as St. Elsewhere, L.A. Law, Nine to Five, Beverly Hills 90210, Walker, Texas Ranger, Home Improvement, Cheers and Frasier. George also played the role of a policeman in the popular television show, Tales from the Crypt.

Games
For the 1996 PC video game and PlayStation port Descent, and its sequels Descent II and Descent 3, DelHoyo voiced the protagonist, the Material Defender.

Voice-over
DelHoyo has become noted as a top voice-over artist, lending his voice to numerous Hollywood film trailers and network television promos. In 2008 he was featured in the book Secrets of Voice-Over Success by voice actress Joan Baker. The following trailers and promos include:
 Horton Hears a Who! (1970) (2008 DVD reissue trailer only)
 E.T. the Extra-Terrestrial (1982) (2002 reissue trailer/TV Spots only)
 Oliver & Company (1988) (2009 DVD reissue trailer only)
 Batman (1989) (ABC Family promos only)
 FernGully: The Last Rainforest (1992) (2005 DVD reissue trailer only)
 The Swan Princess (1994) (2004 DVD reissue trailer/TV spots only)
 Toy Story (1995) (ABC Family promos only)
 Selena (1997) (TV spot only)
 Wild Things (1998)
 Lost in Space (1998)
 Paulie (1998)
 The Swan Princess III: The Mystery of the Enchanted Treasure (1998) (2004 DVD reissue trailer/TV spots only)
 The Rugrats Movie (1998) (teaser trailer on several 1997 Nickelodeon VHS releases)
 Muppets from Space (1999)
 The Adventures of Elmo in Grouchland (1999)
 Pokémon: The First Movie (1999) (promotion part of the second theatrical trailer only)
 My Dog Skip (2000)
 How the Grinch Stole Christmas (2000)
 The Princess Diaries (2001)
 Big Fat Liar (2002)
 Ice Age (2002)
 Treasure Planet (2002)
 Daddy Day Care (2003)
 Legally Blonde 2: Red, White & Blonde (2003)
 Holes (2003)
 Freaky Friday (2003)
 Elf (2003)
 Mona Lisa Smile (2003)
 Ella Enchanted (2004)
 Home on the Range (2004) (home entertainment TV spots only)
 13 Going on 30 (2004) (trailers/TV spots only)
 The Princess Diaries 2: Royal Engagement (2004)
 Shark Tale (2004)
 Because of Winn-Dixie (2005)
 Charlie and the Chocolate Factory (2005)
 Curious George (2006)
 The Pink Panther (2006)
 Ice Age: The Meltdown (2006)
 Garfield: A Tail of Two Kitties (2006)
 Monster House (2006) (TV spots only)
 Everyone's Hero (2006)
 Happy Feet (2006) (TV spots only, trailers did not have any voice-over)
 Meet the Robinsons (2007)
 TMNT (home entertainment TV spots only)
 Shrek the Third (2007)
 Surf's Up (2007)
 Daddy Day Camp (2007)
 Bee Movie (2007) (TV spots only)
 Nim's Island (2008)
 Beverly Hills Chihuahua (2008)
 Four Christmases (2008)
 The Pink Panther 2 (2009)
 Ice Age: Dawn of the Dinosaurs (2009) (TV spots only)
 Up (2009) (Blu-ray/DVD TV spots only)
 Curious George 2: Follow That Monkey! (2010)
 Despicable Me (2010) (ABC Family promos only)
 Ramona and Beezus (2010)
 Rango (2011) (Also the voice of Señor Flan in the film itself.)
 Rio (2011)
 Monte Carlo (2011)
 Arthur Christmas (2011)
 Chimpanzee (2012)
 Ice Age: Continental Drift (2012)
 Escape from Planet Earth (2013) (TV spots only)
 Frozen (2013) (UK TV spots only)
 Rio 2 (2014)
 Bears (2014)
 Dolphin Tale 2 (2014) (TV spots only)
 Monkey Kingdom (2015)
 Ice Age: Collision Course (2016)
 The Kid Who Would Be King (2019) (TV spots only)
 Penguins (2019)
 The Art of Racing in the Rain (2019) (TV spots only, trailers did not have any voice-over)
 Bernie the Dolphin 2 (2019)
 Dolphin Reef (2020) (ultimately cancelled theatrical trailer as Dolphins)

Film
In 1998, DelHoyo starred in the critically acclaimed romantic comedy Dead Letter Office. He appeared in the Academy Award-winning animated feature Rango (2011) produced by Industrial Light & Magic and released by Paramount.

Filmography

Television

Film

References

External links
 
 George Del Hoyo at the Battlestar Wiki, an encyclopedia on the Battlestar Galactica sagas.

1953 births
Living people
American male film actors
American male television actors
American male voice actors
Male actors from Boston
Uruguayan emigrants to the United States
20th-century American male actors
21st-century American male actors